Abu Ayyub al-Ansari  (died c. 674) — born Khalid ibn Zayd ibn Kulayb ibn Tha'laba in Yathrib — was from the tribe of Banu Najjar, was a close companion (Arabic: الصحابه, sahaba) and the standard-bearer of the Islamic prophet Muhammad. Abu Ayyub was one of the Ansar (Arabic: الأنصار, meaning aiders, helpers or patrons) of the early Islamic history, those who supported Muhammad after the hijra (migration) to Medina in 622. The patronym Abu Ayyub, means father (abu) of Ayyub. Abu Ayyub died of illness during the First Arab Siege of Constantinople.

Biography 
Abu Ayyub was born in Medina, Hejaz as Khalid bin Zayd to a Najjar family of the Banu Khazraj. As Abu Ayyub was the head of his family, he was one of the chosen elders in Medina who went to the valley of Aqaba and pledged allegiance to Islam at the hands of Muhammad, who named him Abu Ayyub al-Ansari. After the migration, Muhammad united the Muhajiruns and Ansars into a single allegiance.  

Abu Ayyub was a descendant of Nebaioth, son of Ishmael, through al-Azd, the parent tribe of the Banu Najjar.

Conversion to Islam 
When Muhammad arrived in Medina, all of the inhabitants of the city offered to accommodate him. It is said that the camel was commanded by Allah so Prophet Muhammad let the camel decide to walk where it chose and he would to stay at the house where the camel stopped. The camel stopped at the house of Abu Ayyub al-Ansari, a member of the Banu Najjar, who were regarded as the best tribe of Medina. Though Abu Ayyub al-Ansari had prepared meals for only Muhammad and Abu Bakr, Muhammad directed that everyone in the neighbourhood be invited to partake in the meal. To everyone's surprised delight, all of the approximately 180 people who came were able to eat to their satisfaction. This was deemed to be a miracle.

Waqif in Al-Masjid an-Nabawi 
Waqif of Al-Masjid an-Nabawi: The land of Al-Masjid an-Nabawi belonged to two young orphans, Sahal and Suhayl, and when they learned that Muhammad wished to acquire their land for a mosque, they went to Muhammad and offered the land to him as a gift.  Muhammad insisted on paying for the land because they were orphaned children. The ultimately agreed purchase price was paid by Abu Ayyub al-Ansari who thus became the waqif (or creator of a charitable endowment) of Al-Masjid an-Nabawi on behalf of Muhammad.

He was chosen as the Rashidun governor of Medina during the caliphate of Ali ibn Abi Talib.

Life in Egypt 
Following the Muslim conquest of Egypt, Abu Ayyub moved to Fustat, where he lived in a house adjacent to the mosque of Amr bin Al'aas that had been completed in 642. Several other companions were his neighbours, including Zubayr ibn al-Awwam, Ubaida, Abu Dhar, Abdullah ibn Umar and Abdullah ibn Amr bin Al'aas.

During his military career, "he did not stay away from any battle in which the Muslims engaged from the time of Muhammad to the time of Muawiyah I, unless he was at the same time, engaged in another battle being fought elsewhere."

Last military campaign

In a hadith in Qital al-Rome, a chapter of Sahih Muslim, Muhammad prophesied that the first army to conquer Constantinople will enter Paradise.

Muhammad ibn Jarir al-Tabari records a number of raids against the Byzantine Empire under the period A.H. 49 (9/2/669 - 28/1/670). Though Abu Ayyub was by then an old man, that did not deter him from enlisting. Shortly after engaging in battle, it is recorded that he fell ill and had to withdraw. The chief of army staff Yazid ibn Muawiya asked, "Do you need anything, Abu Ayyub?" to which Abu Ayyub replied, "Convey my salaams (Islamic greeting and farewell) to the Muslim armies and tell them, "Abu Ayyub urges you to penetrate deep into enemy territory, as far as you can go; and that you should carry him with you, and that you should bury me under your feet at the walls of Constantinople." At this, he died. Yazid ordered the Muslim army to fulfil his request, and they pushed back the enemy's forces until they reached the walls of Constantinople where Abu Ayyub was finally interred.

About this battle, Aslam ibn 'Imran narrates that when they were fighting the Byzantines, a Muslim soldier penetrated deep into enemy ranks. The people exclaimed, "Subhan Allah! He has contributed to his own destruction." Abu Ayyub al-Ansari stood up and answered, "O people! You give this interpretation to this verse, whereas it was revealed concerning us the Ansar. When Allah had actually given honour to Islam and its supporters had become many, some of us secretly said to one another, 'Our wealth has been depleted, and Allah has given honour to Islam and its supporters have become many, let us stay amidst our wealth and make up what has been depleted of it.' Thereupon, Allah revealed to Muhammad, 'And spend in the Path of God (فِي سَبِيلِ اللّهِ), and do not contribute to your own destruction / And spend in the way of Allah and do not throw [yourselves] with your [own] hands into destruction [by refraining].'," refuting what we had said.

Mosque and türbe

After the Conquest of Constantinople by the Ottoman Turks, a tomb was constructed above Abu Ayyub's grave and a mosque built in his honour by Sultan Mehmed the Conqueror. From that point on, the area now known as the locality of Eyüp became sacred and many Ottoman officials requested burial in proximity of Abu Ayyub. His tomb was discovered by the Ottoman saint Akşemseddin. The tomb was rebuilt by Sultan Mahmud II in 1882. This mosque was the traditional site for the coronation ceremony of the Ottoman Sultans, where each new Sultan was girded with the Sword of Osman, the founder of the Ottoman Empire.  Obeying the order of Sheikh Edebali, Osman I had gone to the tomb of Abu Ayyub al-Ansari.

Some hadith narrated by Abu Ayyub
Abu Ayyub al-Ansari is credited with narrating many sayings of Muhammad. Well-known examples of these include:

 The Messenger of Allah said: "It is not permissible for a Muslim to shun his brother for more than three nights. When they meet, this one turns away (from that one) and that one turns away (from this one) and the best of them is the one who greets his brother first."
 Abu Ayyub al-Ansari narrates that on the night of Mi'raj, Muhammad passed by Ibrahim (Abraham). Ibrahim asked, "O Jibreel, who is with you?" Jibreel answered, "Muhammad." Ibrahim said to him, "Command your Ummah to plant trees of Paradise in abundance, as the soil of Paradise is fertile and its plain is spacious." It was asked, "Which are the trees of Paradise?" He replied, "La hawla wa la quwwata illa billah (Arabic لا حول ولا قوة إلا بالله)."

See also
 Dhikr
 Salaf
 Sunni view of the Sahaba

Notes

Bibliography

 
 Muhammad ibn Jarir al-Tabari, History v. 18 "Between Civil Wars: The Caliphate of Mu'awiyah," transl. Michael G. Morony, SUNY Press, Albany, 1987.
 Muhammad Ibn Sa'd, Kitab at-Tabaqat al-Kabir, np, nd.
 Prof. Philip K. Hitti, A History of the Arabs, Macmillan, London, 1951 rev.ed.
 

 
Companions of the Prophet

674 deaths
People from Medina
Najjarite people
Ansar (Islam)
Muslim martyrs
Burials at Eyüp Cemetery
Arab people of the Arab–Byzantine wars
Rashidun governors of Medina